The Speaker of the Parliament of Vanuatu is the presiding officer of the legislature of Vanuatu. The salary of the speaker is Vt 291,561 fortnightly (US$60,601.17 annually)

References

Parliament, Speakers
Vanuatu
 
1980 establishments in Vanuatu